Line 2 of the Xi'an Metro is a rapid transit line running from north to south Xi'an. It was opened on 16 September 2011. The line is colored red  on system maps.

Opening timeline

Stations (north to south)

Future Development
The northern and southern extensions of the line started construction on October 31, 2019.

Notes

References

02
Railway lines opened in 2011
2011 establishments in China